The Dennis Township Public Schools are a community public school district that serves  students in pre-kindergarten through eighth grade from Dennis Township, in Cape May County, New Jersey, United States.

As of the 2020–21 school year, the district, comprised of two schools, had an enrollment of 615 students and 62.4 classroom teachers (on an FTE basis), for a student–teacher ratio of 9.9:1.

The district is classified by the New Jersey Department of Education as being in District Factor Group "CD", the sixth-highest of eight groupings. District Factor Groups organize districts statewide to allow comparison by common socioeconomic characteristics of the local districts. From lowest socioeconomic status to highest, the categories are A, B, CD, DE, FG, GH, I and J.

Students in public school for ninth through twelfth grades attend Middle Township High School in Cape May Court House, together with students from Avalon, Stone Harbor and Woodbine, as part of a sending/receiving relationship with the Middle Township Public Schools. As of the 2020–21 school year, the high school had an enrollment of 741 students and 64.6 classroom teachers (on an FTE basis), for a student–teacher ratio of 11.5:1.

Schools
Schools in the district (with 2020–21 enrollment from the National Center for Education Statistics) are:
Dennis Township Primary School with 268 students in grades PreK-2
Dennis Township Elementary / Middle School with 336 students in grades 3-8
Jamie Lynn VanArtsdalen, Principal

Administration
Core members of the district's administration are:
Susan Speirs, Chief School Administrator
Paige Sharp-Rumaker, Business Administrator / Board Secretary

Board of education
The district's board of education, comprised of nine members, sets policy and oversees the fiscal and educational operation of the district through its administration. As a Type II school district, the board's trustees are elected directly by voters to serve three-year terms of office on a staggered basis, with three seats up for election each year held (since 2012) as part of the November general election. The board appoints a superintendent to oversee the district's day-to-day operations and a business administrator to supervise the business functions of the district.

References

External links
Dennis Township Public Schools
 
School Data for the Dennis Township Public Schools, National Center for Education Statistics

Dennis Township, New Jersey
New Jersey District Factor Group CD
School districts in Cape May County, New Jersey